Lepidophyma lineri, Liner's tropical night lizard, is a species of lizard in the family Xantusiidae. It is a small lizard found in Mexico. It is native to the Sierra de Miahuatlán, a sub-range of the Sierra Madre del Sur in south-central Oaxaca.

References

Lepidophyma
Endemic reptiles of Mexico
Fauna of the Sierra Madre del Sur
Reptiles described in 1973
Taxa named by Hobart Muir Smith